This is the discography of 2 Unlimited, a Eurodance project founded in 1991 by Belgian producers Jean-Paul DeCoster and Phil Wilde and fronted by Dutch rapper Ray Slijngaard and Dutch vocalist Anita Doth. With global sales of over 18 million units, 2 Unlimited is one of the biggest selling groups from the Netherlands and Belgium.

Albums

Studio albums

Compilation albums

Remix albums 

{| class="wikitable"
|-
! rowspan="2" | Year
! rowspan="2" | Album Title
! colspan="3" | Chart Position
|-
! style="width:3em;font-size:80%"align="center" | JPN
|-
| 1993
| Power Tracks'''
| align="center" | 62
|-
| 1998
| Non-Stop Mix Best| align="center" | —
|-
| 2001
| Greatest Hits Remixes| align="center" | —
|-
| 2003
| Trance Remixes| align="center" | —
|-
| 2006
| Greatest Remix Hits| align="center" | —
|}

 Singles 

 Video games 

2 Unlimited has a total of 4 songs which appear in the Dance Dance Revolution arcade series. A cover version of the original "Twilight Zone" was featured on Dancing Stage Featuring Disney's Rave, while an official remix of "Twilight Zone" was featured in DDRMAX Dance Dance Revolution 6thMix and two other arcade releases.

Additionally, the original version of "No Limit" appears in Just Dance 3, while the original version of "Tribal Dance" appears in Just Dance 4''.

The Super Nintendo game  Bio-Metal had its soundtrack for the American release reworked entirely of remixes from the 1992 album Get Ready!.

References

External links 

 Official 2 Unlimited website

Discographies of Dutch artists